Faculty of Engineering and Technology  - Yambol is a basic unit in the structure of the University of Thrace - Stara Zagora. It is the successor of the Technical College - Yambol and has almost half a century of tradition in education and training of teachers and technicians, approved by national and regional educational and cultural center.

The "Technique and technology" faculty is funded by the state and teaches on both a regular and part-time basis the following professional fields and specialities:

Specialities

Degree "Bachelor" 
 "Mechanical Engineering": subject "Motor transport and agricultural machinery" (ATZT) with the acquisition of professional qualification "Instructor training drivers" cat. "C" and "T" in "Design, technology and management of the fashion industry" (DTMMI);
 "Electrical and Electronic Engineering": subject "Automatics, Information and Control Systems" (AIUT) in "Electrical" (ET);
 "Energy": in "Heat and gas" (CBC);
 "Food Technology": in "Food Technology" (LC).

Graduates receive FTT degree "Bachelor" and professional "engineer". Through regular and part-time studies graduates can continue to "master" degree level and obtain a professional qualification of "Master Engineer".

Lifelong Learning 
Faculty of Engineering and Technology - Yambol has experience and traditions in the following qualification and postgraduate training:
Professional qualification "Instructor training drivers";
Professional qualification "Teacher";
Recurrent training of teachers for training drivers; 
 Traffic Safety; 
Technology and organization of road transport;

Computer courses - all levels and modules, European Computer Driving Licence (ECDL) and others. 
Technology and Organization of Automobile Transport, Traffic Safety, periodic training of Chairmen of the Board of Examiners for acquiring driving licenses, periodic training of instructors for driver training, periodic training of employees (fitters) air-conditioning systems in some vehicles containing fluorinated greenhouse gases; pedagogical specializations.

Education 
Student enrollment is 531.

The faculty has a new modern material and technical base, three school buildings, modern furnished rooms and laboratories (26 laboratories), bases for training and work placement (9), student dormitories, library, bookstore, canteen for all students, coffee club.

The library amounted to 23,500 volumes of monographs, reference books and scientific periodicals in the field of technical sciences, food technology, economics, pedagogy, and others.

Teaching staff 
7 professors, 26 associate professors, 24 assistants and a senior lecturer. Of these, three are "doctor" and four are "PhD".

Research 
Research in the Faculty "Equipment and Technologies" - Yambol in the areas of motor transport and agricultural machinery, fashion design, textile and sewing technology, electrical engineering, electronics and automation, energy, food technology, natural sciences and the humanities.

Developed over 90 research projects funded by the National Fund "Scientific Research" and the University of Thrace - Stara Zagora. Over the years in this work have included teachers from all faculties. Currently over 80% of teachers, 100% of young teachers and an average of 3 students every two working teams are involved in ongoing projects.

The results of the research are published in articles in foreign and scientific journals, many of which are refereed journals, and are presented in papers presented to scientific forums in Bulgaria and abroad.

The quality of research is the fact that teachers from FTT members of scientific committees and chairmen of sections of scientific conferences abroad, members of editorial boards and editorial boards of scientific journals and collections of scientific forums.
Much of the research is of applied and found expression in implementations or consultancy.

International Activities 
International activity is associated mainly with Erasmus. Contracts are 14 contracts with technical departments and structural units in universities United Kingdom, Germany, Greece, Lithuania, Romania, Slovenia, Turkey and Czech Republic.

Faculty staff is involved in other programs in the EU initiative "Lifelong Learning" as study visits and Gryundvik.

Faculty is involved in the development and implementation of two projects under the programs with partner University of Thrace - Edirne, Turkey.

There are also bilateral agreements for cooperation with universities Ukraine and Georgia - countries not participating in Erasmus.

Sports facilities 
The faculty has a modern sports complex with indoor hall, fitness center, playground.

Yambol
Trakia University